The .450 Adams was a British black powder centrefire revolver cartridge, initially used in converted Beaumont–Adams revolvers, in the late 1860s. Officially designated .450 Boxer Mk I, and also known variously as the .450 Revolver, .450 Colt, .450 Short, .450 Corto, and .450 Mark III, and in America as the .45 Webley, it was the British Army's first centrefire revolver round.

History
The .450 was adopted for the Adams revolver in November 1868, and served until it was replaced in service in 1880  by the .476 Enfield (in the Enfield Mark 1 and 2), which was in turn supplanted by the .455 Webley cartridge in 1887.

Despite the different designations, the .450 may be fired in any weapon chambered for .455 Webley,  .455 Colt, or .476 Enfield.

While not considered a suitable military round, the .450 Mark III cartridges did serve in reserve for the British armed forces as late as the First World War. 
The .450 Adams also proved popular among civilian users of Webley RIC and British Bulldog revolvers, being loaded in Europe, and persisting in the United States until around 1940. Both Colt and Smith & Wesson offered revolvers in .450 Adams.

It was roughly similar in power to the contemporary .38 S&W, .41 Colt, and .44 S&W American.

Handloaded ammunition can be made from shortened .455 Webley brass.

Dimensions

See also
 Table of handgun and rifle cartridges

Notes

Sources
Barnes, Frank C., ed. by John T. Amber. ".450 Revolver", in Cartridges of the World, pp. 170 & 177. Northfield, IL: DBI Books, 1972. .
Barnes, Frank C., ed. by John T. Amber. ".38 Smith & Wesson", in Cartridges of the World, p. 163. Northfield, IL: DBI Books, 1972. .
Barnes, Frank C., ed. by John T. Amber.. ".41 Long Colt", in Cartridges of the World, p. 165. Northfield, IL: DBI Books, 1972. .
Barnes, Frank C., ed. by John T. Amber. ".44 Smith & Wesson American", in Cartridges of the World, p. 167. Northfield, IL: DBI Books, 1972. .
Barnes, Frank C., ed. by John T. Amber.. ".455 Revolver MK-1/.455 Colt", in Cartridges of the World, p. 174. Northfield, IL: DBI Books, 1972. .
Maze, Robert J. Howdah to High Power. Tucson, AZ: Excalibur Publications, 2002. .

External links
 Revive your antique English .450 (.455 - .460) black powder revolvers

Pistol and rifle cartridges
World War I weapons of the United Kingdom
British firearm cartridges